The Wason selection task (or four-card problem) is a logic puzzle devised by Peter Cathcart Wason in 1966. It is one of the most famous tasks in the study of deductive reasoning. An example of the puzzle is:

A response that identifies a card that need not be inverted, or that fails to identify a card that needs to be inverted, is incorrect. The original task dealt with numbers (even, odd) and letters (vowels, consonants).

The test is of special interest because people have a hard time solving it in most scenarios but can usually solve it correctly in certain contexts. In particular, researchers have found that the puzzle is readily solved when the imagined context is policing a social rule.

Solution
The correct response is to turn over the 8 card and the brown card.

The rule was "If the card shows an even number on one face, then its opposite face is red." Only a card with both an even number on one face and something other than red on the other face can invalidate this rule:
 If the 3 card is red (or brown), that doesn't violate the rule. The rule makes no claims about odd numbers. (Denying the antecedent)
 If the 8 card is not red, it violates the rule. (Modus ponens)
 If the red card is odd (or even), that doesn't violate the rule. The red color is not exclusive to even numbers. (Affirming the consequent)
 If the brown card is even, it violates the rule. (Modus tollens)

Use of logic
The interpretation of "if" here is that of the material conditional in classical logic, so this problem can be solved by choosing the cards using modus ponens (all even cards must be checked to ensure they are red) and modus tollens (all non-red cards must be checked to ensure they are non-even).

Alternatively, one might solve the problem by using another reference to zeroth-order logic. In classical propositional logic, the material conditional is false if and only if its antecedent is true and its consequent is false. As an implication of this, two cases need to be inspected in the selection task to check whether we are dealing with a false conditional:

 The case in which the antecedent is true (the even card), to examine whether the consequent is false (the opposite face is not red). 

 The case in which the consequent is false (the brown card), to study whether the antecedent is true (the opposite face is even).

Explanations of performance on the task
In Wason's study, not even 10% of subjects found the correct solution. This result was replicated in 1993.

Some authors have argued that participants do not read "if... then..." as the material conditional, since the natural language conditional is not the material conditional. (See also the paradoxes of the material conditional for more information.)  However one interesting feature of the task is how participants react when the classical logic solution is explained:

This latter comment is also controversial, since it does not explain whether the subjects regarded their previous solution as incorrect, or whether they regarded the problem as sufficiently vague to permit two interpretations.

Policing social rules

As of 1983, experimenters had identified that success on the Wason selection task was highly context-dependent, but there was no theoretical explanation for which contexts elicited mostly correct responses and which ones elicited mostly incorrect responses.

Evolutionary psychologists Leda Cosmides and John Tooby (1992) identified that the selection task tends to produce the "correct" response when presented in a context of social relations. For example, if the rule used is "If you are drinking alcohol, then you must be over 18", and the cards have an age on one side and beverage on the other, e.g., "16", "drinking beer", "25", "drinking soda", most people have no difficulty in selecting the correct cards ("16” and "drinking beer"). In a series of experiments in different contexts, subjects demonstrated consistent superior performance when asked to police a social rule involving a benefit that was only legitimately available to someone who had qualified for that benefit. Cosmides and Tooby argued that experimenters have ruled out alternative explanations, such as that people learn the rules of social exchange through practice and find it easier to apply these familiar rules than less-familiar rules.

According to Cosmides and Tooby, this experimental evidence supports the hypothesis that a Wason task proves to be easier if the rule to be tested is one of social exchange (in order to receive benefit X you need to fulfill condition Y) and the subject is asked to police the rule, but is more difficult otherwise. They argued that such a distinction, if empirically borne out, would support the contention of evolutionary psychologists that human reasoning is governed by context-sensitive mechanisms that have evolved, through natural selection, to solve specific problems of social interaction, rather than context-free, general-purpose mechanisms. In this case, the module is described as a specialized cheater-detection module.

Evaluation of social relations hypothesis 
Davies et al. (1995) have argued that Cosmides and Tooby's argument in favor of context-sensitive, domain-specific reasoning mechanisms as opposed to general-purpose reasoning mechanisms is theoretically incoherent and inferentially unjustified. Von Sydow (2006) has argued that we have to distinguish deontic and descriptive conditionals, but that the logic of testing deontic conditionals is more systematic (see Beller, 2001) and depend on one's goals (see Sperber & Girotto, 2002). However, in response to Kanazawa (2010), Kaufman et al. (2011) gave 112 subjects a 70-item computerized version of the contextualized Wason card-selection task proposed by Cosmides and Tooby (1992) and found instead that "performance on non-arbitrary, evolutionarily familiar problems is more strongly related to general intelligence than performance on arbitrary, evolutionarily novel problems", and writing for Psychology Today, Kaufman concluded instead that "It seems that general intelligence is very much compatible with evolutionary psychology."

See also
Cognition
Confirmation bias
Evolution of human intelligence
Logic
Necessary and sufficient conditions
Psychology of reasoning

References

Further reading

External links

Here is the general structure of a Wason selection task — from the Center for Evolutionary Psychology at the University of California, Santa Barbara
CogLab: Wason Selection — from Wadsworth CogLab 2.0 Cognitive Psychology Online Laboratory
Elementary My Dear Wason – interactive version of Wason Selection Task at PhilosophyExperiments.Com

Logic puzzles
Abstraction
Cognition
Evolutionary psychology

de:Peter Wason#Selection Task